The 1950 NYU Violets football team was an American football team that represented New York University as an independent during the 1950 college football season. 

In their first season under head coach Hugh Devore, the Violets compiled a 1–5–1 record, and were outscored 157–88.

The team played one game in Manhattan, against crosstown rival Fordham at the Polo Grounds. The rest of its schedule was on the road. NYU played no games at its on-campus home field, Ohio Field in University Heights, Bronx.

Schedule

References

NYU
NYU Violets football seasons
NYU Violets football